Boloria chariclea, the Arctic fritillary or purplish fritillary, is a butterfly of the family Nymphalidae. It is found in the northern parts of the Palearctic and Nearctic realms.

Description

The uppersides of the wings are orange brown with small dark markings in neat rows. The underside of the forewing is orange with dark markings. The underside of the hindwing has a margin of small white spots topped with brown. Inside this are black inwardly pointing triangles with scant white areas. The median band is pale yellow brown to rusty brown mottled with white and with wavy, sometimes broken, black lines. The butterfly flies from July to August depending on the location.

Distribution and habitat
The Arctic fritillary has a Holarctic distribution. In Europe it is found in northern Lapland and Russia. In North America it is found in Alaska and much of Canada, the north Cascades, the Rocky Mountains southwards to Utah and northern New Mexico, northern Minnesota, northern Maine and the White Mountains of New Hampshire. Its typical habitat is tundra, taiga, alpine meadows, stream verges and acid bogs.

Life cycle
The males patrol along the edges of bogs and in valleys and wait for the arrival of females. The eggs are laid singly underneath the leaves of the host plant. In North America the larvae feed on viola species, dwarf willows (Salix) and possibly blueberries (Vaccinium) while in Europe it is believed to feed on yellow wood violet (Viola biflora) and Arctic white heather (Cassiope tetragona). Depending on location, the larvae take one or two years to develop into adults, newly hatched caterpillars hibernate during the first winter and fourth-stage caterpillars hibernate during the second.

Subspecies
B. c. chariclea Arctic Europe
B. c. arctica (Zetterstedt, 1839)   Arctic Asia, Wrangel Island, Chukotka
B. c. butleri (Edwards, 1883)   Arctic America, Chukotka, Kamchatka
B. c. boisduvalii (Duponchel, 1832)   Alaska, Alberta, Labrador, Newfoundland, Minnesota, British Columbia
B. c. rainieri  (Barnes & McDunnough, 1913)   Washington
B. c. grandis  (Barnes & McDunnough, 1916)   North British Columbia, Ontario
B. c. montina  (Scudder, 1863)  
B. c. helena   (Edwards, 1871)   Rocky Mountains

References

External links

 Butterflies of Europe
Butterflies and Moths of North America

Boloria
Butterflies of Europe
Butterflies of North America
Insects of the Arctic
Butterflies described in 1794